Patryk Kun (born 20 April 1995) is a Polish professional footballer who plays as a left winger for Raków Częstochowa.

International career
Kun was called up to the senior Poland squad for a friendly match with Scotland on 24 March 2022 and the 2022 FIFA World Cup qualification playoff against Sweden on 29 March 2022.

Career statistics

Honours

Club
Arka Gdynia
 Polish Super Cup: 2017

Raków Częstochowa
 Polish Cup: 2020–21, 2021–22
 Polish Super Cup: 2021, 2022

References

Polish footballers
1995 births
Living people
Association football midfielders
Poland youth international footballers
OKS Stomil Olsztyn players
Rozwój Katowice players
Arka Gdynia players
Raków Częstochowa players
Ekstraklasa players
I liga players
II liga players